Killian Young (born 4 January 1987 in Tralee) is an Irish sportsperson. He plays Gaelic football with his local club Renard GAA, contests the County Championship with divisional side South Kerry, and was a member of the Kerry senior inter-county team from 2006 to 2019.

Having appeared for Kerry in the All-Ireland Minor Football Championship and All-Ireland Under-21 Football Championship, Young made his Kerry senior championship debut in 2006, breaking into the team in 2007. He filled the number 7 jersey when Aidan O'Mahony moved to centre-back to replace Séamus Moynihan. Young played there in the National Football League and retained his place for the All-Ireland Senior Football Championship. He was a member of the Kerry team that won Munster and then the All-Ireland that year, and won Young Player of the Year. He captained Kerry to the 2008 All-Ireland Under-21 Football Championship. He won another senior All-Ireland in 2009 when Kerry overcame old rivals Cork in the final. In 2010, he captained Kerry to the McGrath Cup, overcoming UCC in the final.

References

External links
 http://www.breakingnews.ie/archives/?c=SPORT&jp=mhmhauojgbid&d=2007-10-03
 https://web.archive.org/web/20090805085658/http://www.rte.ie/sport/gaa/2007/0826/kerry.html
 http://www.independent.ie/sport/gaelic-football/u21s-wouldnt-have-filled-in-1294736.html
 https://web.archive.org/web/20080307061645/http://www.rte.ie/sport/gaa/2008/0216/kerry_tyrone.html
 https://web.archive.org/web/20110521143225/http://www.examiner.ie/irishexaminer/pages/story.aspx-qqqg%3Dsport-qqqm%3DGAA-qqqa%3Dsport-qqqid%3D55500-qqqx%3D1.asp
 https://web.archive.org/web/20071118194803/http://www.roscommonherald.ie/news/story/?trs=gbqlqlmh
 http://www.anfearrua.com/story.asp?id=2639

1987 births
Living people
All Stars Young Footballers of the Year
Gaelic football backs
Kerry inter-county Gaelic footballers
Renard Gaelic footballers
South Kerry Gaelic footballers
Winners of three All-Ireland medals (Gaelic football)